The 2019–20 season of the Hoofdklasse was played in four leagues, two Saturday leagues and two Sunday leagues. The champions of each league were to be promoted directly to the 2020–21 Derde Divisie; other teams could have been promoted through playoffs. The exact division of the 2019–20 Hoofdklasse competitions was published on 1 July 2019. The 2019–20 Hoofdklasse started on Saturday 31 August 2019.

Effects of the 2020 coronavirus pandemic 
On 12 March 2020, all football leagues were suspended until 31 March as the Dutch government forbade events due to the COVID-19 pandemic in the Netherlands. On 15 March this period was extended until 6 April. Due to the decision of the Dutch government to forbid all gatherings and events until 1 June, this period was even further extended.

Eventually, on 31 March, the KNVB decided not to resume competitions at the amateur level. They also decided, for those competitions involved, there would be no final standings, and therefore no champions, initially no promotions and no relegations. Most teams had to start next season at the same level as they did this season.

Later on 12 June, the KNVB officially announced that the Derde Divisie would again consist of 36 teams from next season. This was one wish of CVTD, the interest group of football clubs from the Tweede and Derde Divisies. After the loss of the two reserve teams, the withdrawal of FC Lienden and the voluntary relegation of ONS Sneek, the two divisions of the third tier would have consisted of only 15 clubs each. To accommodate all group leaders in the Hoofdklasse, the KNVB decided to make each Derde Divisie group have 18 teams. The Hoofdklasse group leaders, namely Sportlust '46, Staphorst, Hollandia and  Unitas, therefore moved up to the Derde Divisie. The best runners-up of the Saturday and Sunday Hoofdklasse, ACV and JOS Watergraafsmeer respectively, were also allowed to be promoted.

Meppeler Sport Club and Quick '20 gave up playing Sunday football to compete only on Saturdays after this season.

Play-offs

Promotion 
In each competition teams play periods of 10 games, three times per season (30 games per season). After each period the best team which has not yet qualified earns a spot in the play-offs for the Derde Divisie as the period champion. 6 teams from the Saturday Hoofdklasse play against 2 teams from the Saturday Derde Divisie for 2 promotion spots. The teams from the Sunday leagues do the same.

Relegation 
The teams in place 13 and 14 at the end of the season fight against relegation in the relegation play-offs. They face the period champions of the Eerste Klasse.

Saturday A

Teams 

>> Competition cancelled, what's listed below is the situation on 7 March 2020, the date the last matches were played.<<

Standings

Fixtures/results

Saturday B

Teams 

>> Competition cancelled, what's listed below is the situation on 7 March 2020, the date the last matches were played.<<

Standings

Fixtures/results

Sunday A

Teams 

>> Competition cancelled, what is listed below is the situation on 8 March 2020, the date the last matches were played.<<

Standings

Fixtures/results

Sunday B

Teams 

>> Competition cancelled, what is listed below is the situation on 8 March 2020, the date the last matches were played.<<

Standings

Fixtures/results

References 

Vierde Divisie seasons
Hoofdklasse
Netherlands
Hoofdklasse